Shir Khvar Kola (also Romanized as Shīr Khvār Kolā, Shīr Khvar Kolā, and Shīr Khvar Kalā) is a village in Talarpey Rural District, in the Central District of Simorgh County, Mazandaran Province, Iran. At the 2006 census, its population was 555, in 147 families.

References 

Populated places in Simorgh County